The Dog River is a river in Census division 23 in Northern Manitoba, Canada. It is in the Hudson Bay drainage basin and is a right tributary of the Churchill River.

References

Rivers of Northern Manitoba
Hudson Bay drainage basin